The Windsor Castle is a Grade II listed public house at 114 Campden Hill Road near Holland Park, London.

Located on the corner of Campden Hill Road and Peel Street, the pub was built in about 1826 for the Chiswick brewers Douglas and Henry Thompson, on land rented on a 99-year lease from landowner John Ward. The architect is unknown.  Remodelled in 1933, the pub is on the Campaign for Real Ale's National Inventory of Historic Pub Interiors.

References

1826 establishments in England
19th-century architecture in the United Kingdom
Pubs in the Royal Borough of Kensington and Chelsea
Commercial buildings completed in 1826
Grade II listed pubs in London
Kensington
National Inventory Pubs
Grade II listed buildings in the Royal Borough of Kensington and Chelsea